On 13 May 2022, a fire began on the first floor of four-storey office and commercial building in the Mundka area of Delhi, India. It killed 27 people and injured 40 others, and at least 50 people were rescued. The fire is believed to have been started by a short circuit.

The building did not have clearance from the fire department and was not equipped with fire extinguishers. The Delhi police registered the fire as culpable homicide and a criminal conspiracy. They arrested two brothers who owned Cofe Impex Pvt Ltd, a company that manufactures CCTV cameras, in whose office the fire is believed to have started.

While the firefighters allegedly reached the site late, a crane driver saved over 50 people by rescuing them from the blaze. According to the crane driver, the fire service took over an hour and a half to arrive at the scene.

References

2022 disasters in India
2022 fires in Asia
2022 fire
Building and structure fires in India
2022 fire
May 2022 events in India